The 2006 London Marathon was the 26th running of the annual marathon race in London, United Kingdom, which took place on Sunday, 23 April. The elite men's race was won by Kenya's Felix Limo in a time of 2:06:39 hours and the women's race was won by Deena Kastor of the United States in 2:19:36.

In the wheelchair races, Britain's David Weir (1:29:48) and Italy's Francesca Porcellato (1:59:57) won the men's and women's divisions, respectively. Weir was the first person to complete the course in under one and a half hours.

Around 119,000 people applied to enter the race: 47,020 had their applications accepted and 33,578 started the race. A total of 32,924 runners, 22849 men and 10,075 women, finished the race.

Results

Men

Women

Wheelchair men

Wheelchair women

References

Results
Men's results. Association of Road Racing Statisticians. Retrieved 2020-04-13.
Women's results. Association of Road Racing Statisticians. Retrieved 2020-04-13.

External links

Official website

	

2006
London Marathon
Marathon
London Marathon